Howard Kinsman (9 October 1900 – 10 January 1960) was a South African sprinter. He competed in the 200 metres at the 1924 Summer Olympics and the 1928 Summer Olympics.

References

External links
 

1900 births
1960 deaths
People from Ladysmith, KwaZulu-Natal
Athletes (track and field) at the 1924 Summer Olympics
Athletes (track and field) at the 1928 Summer Olympics
South African male sprinters
Olympic athletes of South Africa
Colony of Natal people
Place of birth missing